Kodak Hall at Eastman Theatre is the largest performance venue at the Eastman School of Music of the University of Rochester, located in downtown Rochester, New York.

The theatre was established by industrialist George Eastman and opened on September 4, 1922, as a center for music, dance, and silent film, with orchestral and organ accompaniment.

The theatre is the primary hall for the Eastman School's larger ensembles, including its orchestras, wind ensembles, jazz ensembles, and chorale. It originally contained 3,352 seats, but was substantially revised in 2009 to become a 2,260-seat concert hall with state-of-the-art acoustics optimized for symphonic, popular and chamber music performances.

The theatre is the principal performance venue for the Rochester Philharmonic Orchestra, and the Eastman Opera Theatre presents fully staged operatic productions each spring.

A $5 million renovation of the theater building was completed in October 2004. Eastman Kodak Company, founded by George Eastman, donated $10 million for a subsequent renovation that was completed in October 2009; the building's concert hall was named "Kodak Hall at Eastman Theatre", in recognition of the donation.

Maxfield Parrish's painting "Interlude" originally hung in the Eastman Theatre. The original was moved to the Memorial Art Gallery in 1997 to stabilize its temperature and humidity, and a full-size color reproduction hung in its place.

See also
List of concert halls
Theater in New York

References

External links 

Eastman School of Music

University of Rochester
Theatres in New York (state)
Theatre in New York (state)
Concert halls in New York (state)
Culture of Rochester, New York
Entertainment venues in Rochester, New York